Hayden is a town in Blount County, Alabama, United States. At the 2020 census, the population was 1,342.

Geography
Hayden is located in southwestern Blount County at 33°53'36.236" North, 86°45'25.139" West (33.893399, -86.756983). Hayden Mountain is a broad, low ridge that rises to the northwest above the town.

Hayden has a spread out area consisting of many enclaves and exclaves within the town and the rest of Blount County.

Demographics

2020 census

As of the 2020 United States census, there were 1,342 people, 433 households, and 316 families residing in the town.

2010 census
At the 2010 census, there were 444 people, 188 households, and 134 families residing in the town. The racial makeup of the town was 389 (87.61%) white, 39 (8.78%) black, 3 (0.68%) Native American, 1 (0.23%) Asian, and 12 (2.7%) from two or more races. None of the town's population was Hispanic or Latino.

There were 188 households, of which 53 (28.19%) had children under the age of 18 living with them, 93 (49.47%) were married couples living together, 27 (14.36%) had a female householder with no husband present, 11 (5.85%) were unmarried opposite-sex couples, and 54 (28.72%) were non-families. 49 (26.06%) of all households were made up of individuals, and 20 (10.64%) had someone living alone who was 65 years of age or older. The average household size was 2.36, and the average family size was 2.81.

The population was spread out, with 93 (20.9%) under the age of 18, 39 (8.78%) aged 18 to 24, 108 (24.32%) aged 25 to 44, 143 (32.21%) aged 45 to 64, and 61 (13.7%) who were 65 years of age or older. The median age was 43 years. For every 100 females, there were 98.2 males.

2000 census
At the 2000 census, there were 470 people, 191 households and 136 families residing in the town. The racial makeup of the town was 91.91% White, 6.60% Black or African American, 0.64% Native American, 0.43% Asian, and 0.43% from two or more races. 0.21% of the population were Hispanic or Latino of any race.

There were 191 households, of which 35.6% had children under the age of 18 living with them, 59.2% were married couples living together, 10.5% had a female householder with no husband present, and 28.3% were non-families. 26.7% of all households were made up of individuals, and 8.9% had someone living alone who was 65 years of age or older. The average household size was 2.46 and the average family size was 2.98.

Age distribution was 26.8% under the age of 18, 9.6% from 18 to 24, 28.3% from 25 to 44, 25.3% from 45 to 64, and 10.0% who were 65 years of age or older. The median age was 36 years. For every 100 females, there were 93.4 males. For every 100 females age 18 and over, there were 88.0 males.

The median household income was $31,484, and the median family income was $36,667. Males had a median income of $30,667 versus $17,375 for females. The per capita income for the town was $14,435. About 10.7% of families and 11.0% of the population were below the poverty line, including 6.9% of those under age 18 and 20.3% of those age 65 or over.

Notable person
 Gerald Swindle, professional bass angler who was named 2004 Bassmaster Angler of the Year

References

External links
Town of Hayden official website
West Blount Park, local youth ballpark

Towns in Blount County, Alabama
Towns in Alabama
Birmingham metropolitan area, Alabama